USS Surf (SP-341) was a minesweeper that served in the United States Navy from 1917 to 1919.
 
Surf was built as a commercial fishing trawler of the same name in 1911 by the Fore River Shipbuilding Company at Quincy, Massachusetts, for the Bay State Fishing Company of Boston, Massachusetts. On 21 April 1917, the U.S. Navy leased her for use as a minesweeper during World War I. She was commissioned on 8 May 1917 as USS Surf (SP-341).

Assigned to the 1st Naval District, Surf performed minesweeping duties in northern New England for the remainder of World War I.

Surf was stricken from the Navy List on 2 April 1919 and returned to the Bay State Fishing Company the same day.

References

Department of the Navy Naval History and Heritage Command Online Library of Selected Images: U.S. Navy Ships: USS Surf (SP-341), 1917-1919
NavSource Online: Section Patrol Craft Photo Archive: Surf (SP 341)

Minesweepers of the United States Navy
World War I minesweepers of the United States
Ships built in Quincy, Massachusetts
1911 ships